"Fat Old Sun" is a song by English rock band Pink Floyd, written and sung by David Gilmour. It appears on their 1970 album Atom Heart Mother, and was performed live in a greatly expanded form (often exceeding fourteen minutes), both before and after the album was released (10 October). Live performances of this song date back to 16 July 1970, but only Gilmour and keyboardist Richard Wright appear on the studio version.

Live performance
"Fat Old Sun" was performed live by Pink Floyd from 1970–71 on the Atom Heart Mother World Tour. On stage, the song was transformed from a folk ballad into an extended progressive rock jam, leading off from the blues rock solo after the last refrain. Extended jams would usually follow, including free-form drumming, organ solos and revised chord progressions based on the "Sing to me" vocal line.

More recently, it was adopted by David Gilmour and performed acoustically in the 2001/02 David Gilmour in Concert shows, minus the electric guitar solo. When the Floyd's manager, Steve O'Rourke, died in 2003, Gilmour, Wright and Nick Mason played "Fat Old Sun" and "The Great Gig in the Sky" at O'Rourke's funeral. Early during the tour in support of Gilmour's On an Island album in 2006, the song returned to the set list. This incarnation was composed of the lyrics followed by the concert's backing singers repeating the "sing to me" chorus, then a bluesy version of the guitar solo closer to the length of the album version (the 2006 incarnation clocked in at around seven minutes). A performance from the Royal Albert Hall is featured on Gilmour's DVD, Remember That Night. It is also featured on Gilmour's live album Live in Gdańsk. "Fat Old Sun" was performed during Gilmour's 2015-16 Rattle That Lock Tour and features on his 2017 live release, Live at Pompeii. Gilmour also performed the song at Richard Thompson's 70th birthday concert in September 2019.

Reception
In a review for the Atom Heart Mother album, Alec Dubro of Rolling Stone gave "Fat Old Sun" a negative review, calling the song "English folk at its deadly worst. It's soft and silly." Dubro said the same for "If". In another review for Atom Heart Mother, Irving Tan of Sputnik Music described "Fat Old Sun" as unmemorable. While Tan enjoyed "If", he described "Fat Old Sun" as too similar to "If", further describing that "on an album with only five songs, that becomes quickly noticeable."

More information
This song was considered for the album Echoes: The Best of Pink Floyd (2001), as mooted by James Guthrie, the compilation's producer. "I wasn't allowed to put it on Echoes," Gilmour explained. "I was outvoted." The guitarist repeated this on Johnnie Walker's Radio 2 drivetime show in 2002. Atom Heart Mother is, consequently, unrepresented on Echoes.

"Fat Old Sun" is perhaps best described as a pastoral, a hymn of praise to the countryside (as were several early Pink Floyd songs, such as "Grantchester Meadows" from Ummagumma and "Green Is the Colour" from More). The bell sounds heard at the beginning and the end of the song were later used again in "High Hopes" from their album The Division Bell and in "Surfacing" from their album The Endless River.

Personnel
David Gilmour – lead vocals, electric guitar, acoustic guitar, Mellotron, pedal steel guitar, bass guitar, drums, percussion
Richard Wright – Farfisa organ, Hammond organ

References

1970 songs
1970s ballads
Pink Floyd songs
Folk rock songs
Rock ballads
Songs written by David Gilmour
Song recordings produced by David Gilmour
Song recordings produced by Roger Waters
Song recordings produced by Richard Wright (musician)
Song recordings produced by Nick Mason

he:Atom Heart Mother#צד ב'